Avadi City Municipal Corporation is the civic body governing Avadi, a suburb of Chennai, in the Tiruvallur district of Tamil Nadu, India. It is headed by a executive mayor and governed by a commissioner. It is one of the three municipal corporations within the Chennai Metropolitan Area, the other two being the central Greater Chennai Corporation and a satellite Tambaram City Municipal Corporation.

History and administration 
Municipal Corporation mechanism in India was introduced during British Rule with formation of municipal corporation in Madras (Chennai) in 1688, later followed by municipal corporations in Bombay (Mumbai) and Calcutta (Kolkata) by 1762. 

Avadi Municipal Corporation in Tiruvallur district was formed in year 2019 and is 15th municipal corporation in Tamil Nadu.  Avadi Municipal Corporation has 48 wards with a population of 6.1 lakhs spread in 65 km2. The place is driven industrially  with location of many key industries.

Avadi Municipal Corporation a Commissioner Mayor, a Council, a Standing Committee, a Wards Committee for facilitating various works.

Currently the Municipal Commissioner is K Sivakumar.

Areas of Avadi Municipal Corporation 
The newly established Avadi Corporation will include the 48 wards of the existing Avadi Municipality and its adjoining Avadi, Thirumullaivoyal, Kovilpathagai, Mittanamalli, Pattabiram, Paruthipattu and Housing Board residential areas.

In the future, there is a possibility of merging some areas in the local bodies like Thiruverkadu, Poonamallee, Thiruninravur, Vanagaram, Nemilicherry  Veppampattu and Ayathur with the Avadi Corporation after consulting the people.

Administrative Divisions 
When Avadi City Municipal Corporation was established, it consisted of 48 wards under 4 zones

Zone 1 
Zone 1 comprises 12 wards. Wards numbered 1 to 5, 11, 12, 15 - 19 are included in this zone.

Zone 2 
Zone 2 comprises 12 wards. Wards numbered 6 to 10, 25 - 30, 32 are included in this zone.

Zone 3 
Zone 3 comprises 12 wards. Wards numbered 31, 33 to 35, 40 to 44, 46 to 48 are included in this zone.

Zone 4 
Zone 4 comprises 12 wards. Wards numbered 13, 14, 20 to 24, 36 to 39, 45 are included in this zone.

Wards and councillors

Factors driving Avadi Municipal Corporation 

Avadi Municipal Corporation is driven by following factors:

  Population Growth.
  Increase in annual Income.
  Improvement of Roads.
  Providing drinking water.
  Improving landscape.
  Improving employment opportunities.
  Improving relations between police and public.
  Waste Management.
  Arranging facilities during natural calamities.
  Establishing industrial units.
  Providing sewage connection.

Avadi Municipal Corporation developments 

 Avadi Municipal Corporation  as part of beautification process installed fountains in various junctions.
 Avadi Municipal Corporation had floated tenders to get piped water facilities to its residents.

See also 
 List of municipal corporations in India

References

External links 
 Official website

Government of Chennai
Municipal corporations in Tamil Nadu